Silver Moon was the third single Michael Nesmith recorded as a solo artist and the second to reach the Billboard Hot 100.  Silver Moon was released in 1970 from Nesmith's second solo album, Loose Salute.
Nesmith recorded the song with The First National Band and the song reached number 42 on the Top 100 and number seven on the Adult Contemporary charts.  The track features a pedal steel guitar solo played by O.J. "Red" Rhodes. The song also went to number 13 in Canada and number seven in the Netherlands.

Background
Although Nesmith released several singles following "Silver Moon", "Silver Moon" was his last song to reach a notable status on the charts.  On the B-side of "Silver Moon", the track "Lady of the Valley" appears. The now highly collectable quadraphonic 8-track tape release of Loose Salute (1970) features an extended version of "Silver Moon". It is a full-length rendition of the song with a cold ending.

Similar to Nesmith's earlier single, "Joanne", Nesmith included "Silver Moon" on his regular set of solo concert tours, and the song appears on all three of his live albums: Live At The Palais, Live at the Britt Festival and Movies of the Mind.

Charts

Personnel 
 Michael Nesmith – vocals & rhythm guitar
 John London – bass
 John Ware – drums
 O.J. "Red" Rhodes – pedal steel guitar
 Glen D. Hardin  – piano

References

1970 singles
Songs written by Michael Nesmith
Country rock songs
RCA Victor singles